Union Township is one of twelve townships in Adams County, Indiana. As of the 2010 census, its population was 922.

Geography

Cemeteries
The township contains these cemeteries: Alpha (Bethel), Clark Chapel, Immanuel Lutheran (Bleeke), Salem and Saint John Reformed.

Major highways

Airports and landing strips
 Decatur Hi-Way Airport

School districts
 North Adams Community Schools

Political districts
 Indiana's 6th congressional district
 State House District 79
 State Senate District 19

References

Citations

References
 
 United States Census Bureau 2007 TIGER/Line Shapefiles
 United States National Atlas

External links

 Indiana Township Association
 United Township Association of Indiana

Townships in Adams County, Indiana
Townships in Indiana